Andrea Anne Coore (born 1969), is a female former athlete who competed for England.

Athletics career
She became the British champion in 1997 after winning the British long jump title.

She represented England in the long jump event, at the 1998 Commonwealth Games in Kuala Lumpur, Malaysia.

References

1969 births
Living people
English female long jumpers
Athletes (track and field) at the 1998 Commonwealth Games
Commonwealth Games competitors for England